Kerry Anna Godliman (born November 1973) is an English actor and comedian best known for her roles in Derek, Bad Move and After Life.

Early life
Godliman was born in Perivale, West London, and trained at Rose Bruford College in South London.

Career

Television
In the first decade of the 2000s, Godliman appeared in a variety of television productions, including Spoons, Law of the Playground, Rush Hour, Michael McIntyre's Comedy Roadshow, and Home Time. She played Hannah in Ricky Gervais's Channel 4 sitcom Derek, Belinda Dawes in Our Girl, and Liz Carter in Carters Get Rich.

In 2017, Godliman landed the role of Nicky in the ITV sitcom Bad Move and in 2018, she played Peggy Aytean in the Channel 4 computer game series Rob Beckett's Playing for Time. The same year, she won the seventh series of Dave's comedy game show Taskmaster, beating James Acaster, Jessica Knappett, Phil Wang, and Rhod Gilbert. Between 2017 and 2019, she made a number of appearances on the celebrity panel show Mock the Week.

In 2019, Godliman starred as Lisa in Ricky Gervais's black comedy series After Life. She reprised her role in series two and three, in 2020 and 2022, respectively. A year later, she played ex-MP Stella Maitland in the Channel 4 four-part drama series Adult Material.
She portrayed the lead character of Pearl Nolan in the mystery series Whitstable Pearl.

In 2022, Godliman appeared in the crime thriller series Trigger Point.

Radio

Godliman has appeared on BBC Radio 4's At the Fringe. From the end of April 2013, she also had her own four-part series on Radio 4, Kerry's List. In August 2014, she made her first appearance on the long-running BBC Radio 4 quiz Just a Minute. In 2017, she starred alongside Stephanie Cole in an episode of John Finnemore's Double Acts on Radio 4 and (with Marcus Brigstocke) in The Wilsons Save the World.

She also starred as a guest on the satirical radio show The Now Show to reflect on International Women's Day on 10 March 2017, and took part in episodes 3 and 4 of I'm Sorry I Haven't a Clue, series 70, that were recorded in Woking. She has appeared on The News Quiz.

Stand-up comedy
Godliman has performed as a stand-up comedian throughout her career, including several appearances on Live at the Apollo, and she tours extensively in this capacity. In January 2022, she performed her show Bosh at Blackheath Halls, London. In a review for The Guardian, writer Brian Logan praised the show, rating it 3/5 stars, and stating that the performance is filled with "vigour, charm and plenty [of] good gags". Godliman's tour is expected to last several months across the UK.

Personal life
Godliman is married to actor Ben Abell. They have two children together and live in South London.

Selected filmography

References

External links
 
 

Living people
English stand-up comedians
English television actresses
English women comedians
20th-century English actresses
21st-century English actresses
Actresses from London
People from Perivale
Alumni of Rose Bruford College
20th-century English comedians
21st-century English comedians
1973 births